Jonathan Joseph Ngwem (born 20 July 1991) is a Cameroonian international footballer who plays for Egyptian club Future FC as a left back.

Career
Born in Douala, Ngwem has played for Pouma, Jeunesse Bonamoussadi, Unisport, Progresso do Sambizanga, El Gouna and Future FC.

He made his international debut in 2015, and was named in the squad for the 2017 Africa Cup of Nations.

References

1991 births
Living people
Cameroonian footballers
Cameroon international footballers
Unisport Bafang players
Progresso Associação do Sambizanga players
El Gouna FC players
Future FC (Egypt) players
Girabola players
Egyptian Premier League players
Association football fullbacks
2017 Africa Cup of Nations players
2017 FIFA Confederations Cup players
Cameroonian expatriate footballers
Cameroonian expatriate sportspeople in Angola
Expatriate footballers in Angola
Cameroonian expatriate sportspeople in Egypt
Expatriate footballers in Egypt
2016 African Nations Championship players
Cameroon A' international footballers